The 2015 Idaho Vandals football team represented the University of Idaho in the 2015 NCAA Division I FBS football season. They were led by third year head coach Paul Petrino and played their home games at Kibbie Dome in Moscow, Idaho. The Vandals were football only members the Sun Belt Conference. They finished the season 4–8, 3–5 in Sun Belt play to finish in a five way tie for fifth place.

Schedule
Idaho announced their 2015 football schedule on February 27, 2015. The 2015 schedule consisted of six home and away games in the regular season. The Vandals hosted Sun Belt foes Appalachian State, Georgia Southern, Louisiana–Monroe, and Texas State, and traveled to Arkansas State, New Mexico State, South Alabama, and Troy.

Schedule source:

Game summaries

Ohio

at USC

Wofford

Georgia Southern

at Arkansas State

at Troy

Louisiana–Monroe

at New Mexico State

at South Alabama

Appalachian State

at Auburn

Texas State

References

Idaho
Idaho Vandals football seasons
Idaho Vandals football